Christ School may refer to:

 Christ School (North Carolina), Arden, North Carolina, USA
 Christ School, Bangalore, Bangalore, India